James Millner may refer to:

James Millner (doctor) (1830–1875), doctor and pioneer of northern Australia
Jim Millner (1919–2007), pharmacist and Australian corporate executive